Benjamin Van Itterbeeck (born 16 April 1964) is a former Belgian racing cyclist. He won the Belgian national road race title in 1991.

References

External links
 

1964 births
Living people
Belgian male cyclists
People from Heist-op-den-Berg
Cyclists from Antwerp Province